Shaykh Ahmad At Tijânî Ibn Bâba Al 'Alawî (date of birth unknown - 1888) was a Maliki jurist of the city of Chinguit in Mauritania, a theologian Ash'ari and Tijani imam. He is frequently called Ibn Ahmad Baba.

He was the author of many poems including his famous book on the Tariqah Tijaniyyah entitled Munyat Ul Murid, which was later commented by Shaykh Mohammed Larbi Sayeh, and a beautiful poem about the wives of Muhammad.

He died in Medina in 1888 and is buried in Al Baqi cemetery located next to the Al-Masjid an-Nabawi.

References 

Maliki fiqh scholars
Mauritanian poets
19th-century imams
Mauritanian Muslims
Mauritanian male writers
Male poets
19th-century poets
19th-century male writers
1888 deaths
Tijaniyyah order